| tries = {{#expr:
 + 7 + 7 + 4 + 1 + 1 + 3
 + 3 + 9 + 1 + 3 + 3 + 6
 + 3 + 2 + 7 + 6 + 6 + 7
 + 3 + 5 + 1 + 3 + 8 + 3
 + 2 + 3 + 6 + 3 + 2 + 4
 + 5 + 1 + 4 + 4 + 5 + 6
 + 5 + 4 + 3 + 5 + 6 + 4
 + 5 + 4 + 4 + 2 + 5 + 3
 + 4 + 4 + 5 + 6 + 7 + 7
 + 2 + 5 + 6 + 0 + 4 + 5
 + 6 + 4 + 8 + 7 + 1 + 6
 + 0 + 7 + 6 + 7 + 5 + 5
 + 4 + 6 + 7 + 4 + 5 + 4
 + 1 + 10 + 9 + 4 + 6 + 3
 + 3 + 6 + 8 + 5 + 5 + 9
 + 3 + 3 + 8 + 1 + 7 + 0
 + 2 + 7 + 6 + 5 + 7 + 4
 + 5 + 7 + 2 + 6 + 5 + 5
 + 10 + 7 + 9 + 5 + 7 + 10
 + 11 + 4 + 4 + 2 + 6 + 8
 + 9 + 6 + 5 + 3 + 7 + 4
 + 11 + 2 + 3 + 8 + 12 + 2
}}
| top point scorer = Neil Jenkins (Celtic Warriors)(273 points)
| top try scorer = Jamie Robinson (Cardiff Blues)(12 tries)
| website = www.rabodirectpro12.com
| prevseason = 2002–03
| nextseason = 2004–05
}}
The 2003–04 Celtic League was the third Celtic League season, and the first following the formation of the five regional rugby sides in Wales. The Celtic League, having previously been played as a pool stage followed by knockout rounds was restructured into a typical league system, based on home and away games only. The league was won by the Llanelli Scarlets, with all the other Welsh regions finishing in the top 6. Following this season, the Celtic Warriors were bought-out and disbanded by the Welsh Rugby Union, and in subsequent years, only four Welsh sides have competed.

Teams

Table

Fixtures

Round 1

Round 2

Round 3

Round 4

Round 5

Round 6

Round 7

Round 8

Round 9

Round 10

Round 11

Round 12

Round 13

Round 14

Round 15

Round 16

Round 17

Round 18

Round 19

Round 20

Round 21

Round 22

Leading scorers
Note: Flags to the left of player names indicate national team as has been defined under IRB eligibility rules, or primary nationality for players who have not yet earned international senior caps. Players may hold one or more non-IRB nationalities.

Top points scorers

Top try scorers

Notes

References

External links
 Magners League official website 
 2003–04 Celtic League at BBC
 Results from Magners League official website 
 Celtic League table from WRU

 
2003-04
Celtic League
Celtic League
Celtic League
Celtic League